Fincken is a municipality in the Mecklenburgische Seenplatte district, in Mecklenburg-Vorpommern, Germany.

Geography
The municipality Fincken is located in the Mecklenburg Lake District in a hilly area, of which Eckersberg at 96 m above sea level is the highest point. In the municipality is the river Elde carrying into Finckener lake. The town Röbel is approximately twelve kilometers away.

Populated places
Fincken includes the following districts:

 Fincken proper: Fincken, Käselin, Knüppeldamm
 Jaebetz: Jaebetz, Dammwolde, Fichtental, Marienhof

In Dammwolde is the historically interesting Evangelical Church Dammwolde.

History
Fincken was first mentioned in 1310 in a contract between the Prince of Werle and the Margraviate of Brandenburg. Among the owners of the village were the knights of Grambow, the families of Pritzbuer, Helmuth von Pederstorff and the aristocratic family von Blücher. At times, there was a glassworks in today's district Knüppeldamm.

The Fincken church dates back to 1748. It is probably the only church in the country church (Landeskirche) of Mecklenburg, which was leased by the Protestant parish to the community. Together they successfully raised money to maintain the building, and as a result, in 2009, the ceiling of the church room was renovated.

In the early 1930s Fincken and other places in the area were settled with many farmers.

With effect from 1 January 2010, the municipality Jaebetz was incorporated to Fincken.

Crest
The coat of arms was designed by the graphic artist Werner Schinko from Röbel (1929-2016). It was approved on 10 July 2000 by the Ministry of Internal Affairs.
Blazon: "In gold a red round barn with flat black conical roof, black truss in the upper wall portion and a closed black gate between two small black arched windows in the lower wall portion; including three (2:1) border blue finches, each with a golden eye ".

Attractions

Interesting is the former Gutshaus mansion in Fincken, which was used in the communist era as working holiday home. Now it has been restored and converted into a hotel, but is now empty again. The Kavalierhaus of the former mansion is operated as a hotel since 2010. The round barn was a former horse stables dating from the 18th century and is now after a renovation a community center. A few hundred meters east of Fincken was exposed a glacial erratic on  Bundesautobahn 19. The area around Fincken is accessible by hiking trails.

Transportation
Near Fincken crosses the national road B 198 the Bundesautobahn 19 (Wittstock-Rostock) with the exit Röbel. Fincken had a breakpoint on the railway Ganzlin-Röbel. Passenger traffic on the route has already been shut down in 1966. The track was shut down in 2012 and dismantled in January 2013. The nearest train station for passengers is now located in Malchow.

References

Municipalities in Mecklenburg-Western Pomerania